Frederick Pegram (19 December 1870 Somers Town, London - 23 August 1937), was a prolific English illustrator and cartoonist who produced work for The Pall Mall Gazette, Punch Magazine, The Idler, Illustrated London News, The Tatler, and The Daily Chronicle. He studied under Fred Brown and spent some time in Paris. He also painted, drew pencil portraits, did watercolours, used chalk and pastel, and produced etchings. He became one of the most consistent of magazine illustrators, maintaining a high standard and preferring a Georgian setting for his works. He succumbed to lung cancer on 23 August 1937.

The son of Alfred Pegram, a cabinet maker, Frederick, enrolled at the Westminster School of Art at age 15. Some of his fellow students were Henry Tonks, Aubrey Beardsley and Maurice Greiffenhagen. Pegram served as Special Constable at Buckingham Palace during World War I. Pegram's draughtsmanship was widely acclaimed and he produced the artwork for Mackintosh's Toffee advertisements, Player's, Ronuk Wax Polish, Selfridges, and some versions of the iconic Kodak Girl. Between 1889 and 1904 he exhibited regularly at the Royal Academy, and in 1925 was elected a member of the Royal Institute of Painters in Watercolours, where he was a frequent exhibitors. He also designed posters for the Underground Group. In 1918 he moved into one of 15 artist's studios that were known as 'The Avenue' and located at 76 Fulham Road.

The sculptor and medallist Alfred Bertram Pegram (17 January 187314 January 1941) was one of Frederick's younger brothers. Frederick and Alfred were cousins to the four brock brothers, all illustrators, who worked together in their studio in Cambridge. Frederick, Alfred, and the Brock brothers were all first cousins to the sculptor Henry Alfred Pegram  (27 July 186225 March 1937).


Books illustrated
Poor Jack (1897), At the Rising of the Moon (1898), London's World Fair (1898), The Orange Girl (1899) and Martin Chuzzlewit (1900), A Lost Leader. Marriage à la Mode, The Missioner, Tea-Table Talk; Sybil, Or The Two Nations (1895).

Notes

References

External links

 
The Kodak Girl

Gallery

Punch (magazine) cartoonists
English cartoonists
1870 births
1937 deaths
Deaths from lung cancer
English illustrators